Richard L. Siderowf (born July 3, 1937) is an American amateur golfer, who is  best known for winning the British Amateur twice.

Early life
Siderowf was born in New Britain, Connecticut. He attended Duke University and played golf for the Blue Devils.

Golf career 
Siderowf's first British Amateur victory came in 1973, a 5 & 3 victory over Peter H. Moody, at Royal Porthcawl Golf Club in Wales. His second British title came in 1976, on the 37th hole over J.C. Davies. In the match against Davies, over the Old Course at St Andrews in Scotland, Siderowf hooked his ball so far left on the 36th hole of the match—the 18th at St Andrews—that it came to rest next to the caddiemaster's office near the first tee. Befuddled, he asked his local caddie the distance to the green, and the caddie replied, "I don't know, I've never had someone hit it here before." Siderowf managed a halve and won the championship on the first hole of sudden death.

In his career, Siderowf has won numerous other amateur tournaments. He is a five-time winner of both the Connecticut Amateur and the Metropolitan Amateur. He won the Connecticut Open three times and the Northeast Amateur twice. He has also won the Canadian Amateur, the New England Amateur, the Sunnehanna Amateur, and the Azalea Invitational.

One of America's most renowned amateurs, Siderowf played on four Walker Cup teams (1969, 1973, 1975, 1977), and was captain of the 1979 team, all winning teams. He also played on two Eisenhower Trophy teams, in 1968 (winning) and 1976.

Former Ryder Cup captain and PGA Championship winner Hal Sutton credited Siderowf with jump-starting his career, by selecting him to the Walker Cup team in 1979, Sutton's first major international competition.

In 1982, Siderowf attempted to become the first American to win the British Amateur three times. He reached the fourth round where he played South African Wilhelm Winsnes. Siderowf, in his words, "hit a lot of dumb shots out there" including a number of missed "short putts." He lost to par six times which facilitated Winsnes' 4 & 3 victory.

Siderowf still plays golf regularly, mostly at Century Country Club in Purchase, New York, where he won the club championship in 1978 in his only attempt, The Connecticut Golf Club in Easton, CT as well as at Seminole Golf Club, the renowned Donald Ross design in Juno Beach, Florida.

Siderowf was inducted into the Connecticut Golf Hall of Fame in 1974, and the Duke Sports Hall of Fame in 1988.

Personal life 
For his career, Siderowf worked as a stockbroker.

Tournament wins
1955 Connecticut Amateur
1958 Connecticut Open
1959 Connecticut Open
1960 Connecticut Amateur
1961 Sunnehanna Amateur, New England Amateur
1962 Northeast Amateur
1965 Connecticut Amateur
1966 Northeast Amateur
1968 Metropolitan Amateur
1969 Azalea Invitational, Metropolitan Amateur
1970 Metropolitan Amateur
1971 Canadian Amateur
1973 British Amateur, Connecticut Open
1974 Metropolitan Amateur
1976 British Amateur
1984 Connecticut Amateur
1985 Connecticut Amateur
1989 Metropolitan Amateur
1996 Metropolitan Senior Amateur

U.S. national team appearances
Amateur
Eisenhower Trophy: 1968 (winners), 1976
Walker Cup: 1969 (winners), 1973 (winners), 1975 (winners), 1977 (winners), 1979 (winners, non-playing captain)

References

American male golfers
Amateur golfers
Duke Blue Devils men's golfers
Golfers from Connecticut
Sportspeople from New Britain, Connecticut
1937 births
Living people